Lynda Hamri (born 8 February 1989) is a visually impaired Paralympian athlete from Algeria competing mainly in T12 classification sprint and long jump events. Hamri represented Algeria at two Summer Paralympics, winning a silver in the long jump at the 2012 Summer Paralympics in London and a bronze in the same event four years later in Rio de Janeiro. Hamri has also won two silver medals at the IPC World Championships, both in the long jump, at Lyon in 2013 and at Doha in 2015.

Personal history
Hamri was born in Bab El-Oued, Algeria in 1989. She was born with a congenital eye condition, maculopathy, which is a deteriorating illness that effects her vision. Hamri comes from a large family of six sisters; one of which has the same eye condition.

Sporting career
Hamri was described as a childhood tomboy by her mother, and enjoyed playing football with the other children in her neighbourhood. When the Tadjar family moved into their building, their daughter, who was an athletics coach, spotted in potential in Hamri. After her first training session Hamri fell for the sport, and spent the next few years moving through different clubs, but it was later noticed that her vision began to deteriorate and her illness was confirmed by a doctor.

Due to her failing eyesight, Hamri was classified as a T13 athlete and in 2007 she represented Algeria at her first major international competition, the 2007 All-Africa Games, where she won a bronze medal in the long jump. The high-point of her career came at the 2012 Summer Paralympics in London, where she qualified for both the 100 metre sprint (T13) and the long jump (F13). Despite posting a season's best in the sprint, Hamri was unable to progress through to the finals. Her efforts in the long jump paid greater dividends with a distance of 5.31m winning her the silver medal.

Further success followed over two successive IPC Athletics World Championships, 2013 in Lyon and 2015 in Doha where, now classified as a T12 athlete due to her condition worsening, she won two silver medals in the long jump event. At the 2016 Summer Paralympics in Rio de Janeiro, Hamri again entered the 100 metre sprint and the long jump. In the 100 metre heats, she qualified as a fastest losing athlete, but then failed to qualify through the semi-finals. Her success, as in London, came through the long jump, where she finished in bronze medal position, with a jump of 5.53 metres.

Notes

External links
 

1989 births
Algerian female sprinters
Algerian female long jumpers
Paralympic athletes of Algeria
Athletes (track and field) at the 2012 Summer Paralympics
Athletes (track and field) at the 2016 Summer Paralympics
Athletes (track and field) at the 2020 Summer Paralympics
Medalists at the 2012 Summer Paralympics
Medalists at the 2016 Summer Paralympics
Medalists at the 2020 Summer Paralympics
Paralympic silver medalists for Algeria
Paralympic bronze medalists for Algeria
Living people
People from Bab El Oued
African Games bronze medalists for Algeria
African Games medalists in athletics (track and field)
Athletes (track and field) at the 2007 All-Africa Games
Athletes (track and field) at the 2011 All-Africa Games
Paralympic medalists in athletics (track and field)
21st-century Algerian people